Suzette Llewellyn  is an English actress, known for her roles as Sister Cheryl Patching on Surgical Spirit, Estelle Vere on Doctors and Sheree Trueman on EastEnders from 2019 to 2021. During the 2020 lock down she co edited Still Breathing, 100 Black Voices on Racism, 100 Ways to Change the Narrative with fellow actor Suzanne Packer. The book was published by HarperCollins in 2021.

Career
Llewellyn studied acting at LAMDA from 1980 to 1983. She made her professional stage debut as Viola in Twelfth Night with Northumberland Touring Company in 1983. Her television debut was as Sharon in the 1984 television film Stars of the Roller State Disco. She then made guest appearances in television series such as Black Silk, Rockliffe, The New Statesman, Screen One and Runaway Bay. From 1989 to 1995, Llewellyn starred in the ITV sitcom Surgical Spirit as Sister Cheryl Patching.

In 1991 she co-founded BiBi Crew, Britain's first theatre comedy troupe made up entirely of Black women. From 2013 to 2017, Llewellyn played the recurring role of Nina Morrison in the ITV soap opera Coronation Street. From 2014 to 2015, Llewellyn starred in the CBBC series Rocket's Island, as Wendy Sparks. In 2016, she portrayed the role of Margaret Smith in the Channel 4 soap opera Hollyoaks for six episodes. Then in 2017, she played Doria Ragland in the Channel 4 comedy series The Windsors. In 2018, she began appearing in the BBC medical drama Holby City as Nanette Duval, and in 2019, Llewellyn appeared in the BBC soap opera Doctors as Estelle Vere. Later that year, she began portraying the regular role of Sheree Trueman in the BBC soap opera EastEnders.

Filmography

Film

Television

References

External links
 

1962 births
Living people
English people of Nigerian descent
Black British actresses
Actresses from London
English film actresses
English television actresses
English soap opera actresses
People from Hammersmith
20th-century English actresses
21st-century English actresses